The Soviet steamer Dalstroy (formerly known as the Genrikh Yagoda) operated in the 1930s and 1940s from the port of Nakhodka to Magadan, delivering cargo and prisoners to Kolyma. On July 24, 1946, during the loading of ammonal in Nakhodka, an explosion occurred due to gross safety violations. The explosion resulted in the death of 105 people, as well as significant property damage and environmental pollution.

Explosion

Causes 
In one of the holds, as a result of careless handling and a serious breach of safety precautions, seven thousand tons of ammonal had started to burn while being loaded onto the Dalstroy. In another hold, because of the increased heat, four hundred tons of TNT exploded completely destroying the port facilities at Cape Astafieva and causing numerous casualties. Some of the ship’s crew, having disembarked shortly before the explosion, were in a protected area and sustained only minor injuries.

After the explosion, the captain of the ship Oryol, which was also loaded with ammonal, ordered that his ship be unloaded immediately. The barge onto which this ammonal was unloaded caught fire during the investigation of the explosion. A day after the fire on the barge a freight car loaded with ammonal and located on rail sidings also caught fire and burned. This saved the surviving crew members, who were exonerated from blame for the explosion.

Consequences 
From the minister of internal affairs, Sergei Kruglov, to Joseph Stalin and Lavrentiy Beria; August 14, 1946: 

The damage to the port was so serious that the bulk of freight traffic, including the transport of prisoners to Kolyma, was moved to the port at Vanino. As a result of the blast there was a "fuel oil rain" that lasted for two hours, during which time nearly two tons of fuel oil, which had been lifted into the sky by the explosion, returned to earth.

References

Footnotes

Bibliography 

 Взрыв на «Дальстрое» // Материалы интернет-газеты «Владивосток»
 Взрыв парохода «Дальстрой» и последствия его для истории ГУЛАГа // Материалы сайта «Радио Свобода»
 В. Шаламов. Очерки преступного мира. Сучья война // Материалы сайта «Всё о жизни в тюрьме»

1946 in the Soviet Union
Explosions in 1946
July 1946 events in Europe
Maritime incidents in 1946
Maritime incidents in the Soviet Union
Ships sunk by non-combat internal explosions